Wolf House may refer to:

Jacob Wolf House, Norfork, Arkansas, NRHP-listed
Wolf House (Berkeley Student Cooperative), Berkeley, California
Wolf House (Glen Ellen, California), associated with author Jack London
Wolf House (Denver, Colorado), a Denver Landmark
George John Wolf House, Hammond, Indiana, NRHP-listed
Josephus Wolf House, Valparaiso, Indiana, NRHP-listed
Mier Wolf House, Mason City, Iowa, NRHP-listed
Charles Wolf House, Parkersburg, Iowa, NRHP-listed
William R. Wolf House, Waseca, Minnesota, NRHP-listed
Wolf-Ruebeling House, Defiance, Missouri, NRHP-listed
The Wolf House, 2018 Chilean film

See also

Penrose Wolf Building, Rockwood, Pennsylvania, NRHP-listed
Wolf Hotel, Ellinwood, Kansas, NRHP-listed
Wolfe House (disambiguation)